NGC 4790 is a barred spiral galaxy located in the constellation of Virgo. It was discovered on 25 March 1786 by William Herschel and included in the New General Catalogue in 1888. It is a member of the NGC 4699 Group of galaxies, which is a member of the Virgo II Groups, a series of galaxies and galaxy clusters strung out from the southern edge of the Virgo Supercluster. 

In 2012, a possible supernova, SN 2012au was detected in NGC 4790. This supernova later produced evidence of a pulsar wind nebula which appears to be expanding outward at approximately 2300 km/s.

See also
Extragalactic astronomy
List of galaxies
List of NGC objects
New General Catalogue

References

External links 
 
SIMBAD entry
NASA Extragalactic Database entry
Messier45 entry 
VizieR

4790
Virgo (constellation)
Barred spiral galaxies
043972